is the 20th studio album by Japanese singer/songwriter Mari Hamada, released on February 17, 2010 by Meldac/Tokuma Japan. It was Hamada's first studio release in nearly two years, and it marked her return to her heavy metal roots, with Loudness guitarist Akira Takasaki as a guest musician.

Aestetica peaked at No. 35 on Oricon's albums chart, marking a resurgence in her popularity.

Track listing

Personnel 
 Akira Takasaki – guitar
 Michael Landau – guitar
 Michael Thompson – guitar
 Hiroyuki Ohtsuki – guitar, bass
 Takashi Masuzaki – guitar
 Leland Sklar – bass
 Kōichi Terasawa – bass
 Shōtarō Mitsuzono – bass
 Takanobu Masuda – keyboards
 Gregg Bissonette – drums
 Hirotsugu Homma – drums
 Satoshi "Joe" Miyawaki – drums

Charts

References

External links 
  (Mari Hamada)
 Official website (Tokuma Japan)
 
 

2010 albums
Japanese-language albums
Mari Hamada albums
Tokuma Shoten albums